George Francis Hogan (April 12, 1915 – January 19, 1965) was an American professional basketball player. He played in the National Basketball League for the Hammond Ciesar All-Americans, Chicago Bruins, and Chicago American Gears. He averaged 3.1 points per game for his career.

References 

1915 births
1965 deaths
American men's basketball players
Basketball players from Chicago
Chicago American Gears players
Chicago Bruins players
Forwards (basketball)
Guards (basketball)
Hammond Ciesar All-Americans players
Loyola Ramblers men's basketball players